Cass Township, Ohio, may refer to:

Cass Township, Hancock County, Ohio
Cass Township, Muskingum County, Ohio
Cass Township, Richland County, Ohio

Ohio township disambiguation pages